The Big Bend slider (Trachemys gaigeae), also called the Mexican Plateau slider, is a species of aquatic turtle in the family Emydidae. The species is endemic to the Southwestern United States and northern Mexico.

Taxonomy
The species Trachemys gaigeae was first described by professor of zoology at the University of Michigan, Dr. Norman Edouard Hartweg, in 1939, as a subspecies, Pseudemys scripta gaigeae. Later, it was assigned to the genus Chrysemys, then to the genus Trachemys. Most recently, it was granted full species status, though many sources still refer to it by its various synonyms.

The Nazas slider (T. hartwegi) of the Nazas River in northern Mexico was formerly considered a subspecies of T. gaigeae, but was reclassified as a distinct species by the Turtle Taxonomy Working Group and the Reptile Database in 2021.

Geographic range
T. gaigeae is native to the United States in the states of New Mexico and Texas, and to northern Mexico in the state of Chihuahua. It is found primarily in the Rio Grande and Rio Concho.

Etymology
The epithet, gaigeae, is in honor of American herpetologist Helen Beulah Thompson Gaige, who collected the first specimen in the Big Bend region of Texas in 1928.

Behavior
Primarily aquatic, the Big Bend slider is often seen basking on rocks or logs in the water, and when approached quickly dives to the bottom. The only time it spends a large amount of time on land is when females emerge to lay eggs. It is an omnivorous species, with younger animals being more carnivorous, and progressively becoming more herbivorous as they age, with older adults being nearly entirely herbivorous.

Description
Adults of T. gaigeae have a straight carapace length of 5 to 11 inches (13 to 28 cm).

References

External links

Further reading
Behler JL, King FW (1979). The Audubon Society Field Guide to North American Reptiles and Amphibians. New York: Alfred A. Knopf. 743 pp. . (Chrysemys scripta gaigeae, p. 453).
Conant R (1975). A Field Guide to Reptiles and Amphibians of Eastern and Central North America, Second Edition. Boston: Houghton Mifflin. xviii + 429 pp. + Plates 1-48.  (hardcover),  (paperback). (Chrysemys scripta gaigeae, p. 63 + Figure 10 on p. 58 + Map 25).
Hartweg N (1939). "A New American Pseudemys ". Occasional Papers of the Museum of Zoology, University of Michigan (397): 1–4. (Pseudemys scripta gaigeae, new subspecies).
Legler JM (1990). "Chapter 7. The Genus Pseudemys in Mesoamerica: Taxonomy, Distribution, and Origins". In: Gibbons JW (1990). Life History and Ecology of the Slider Turtle. Washington, District of Columbia: Smithsonian Institution Press. 368 pp. . (Pseudemys scripta hartwegi, new subspecies, pp. 89–91, Figure 7.5, Tables 7.2-7.6).
Smith HM, Brodie ED Jr (1982). Reptiles of North America: A Guide to Field Identification. New York: Golden Press. 240 pp. . (Pseudemys scripta gaigeae, pp. 56–57).
Stebbins RC (2003). A Field Guide to Western Reptiles and Amphibians, Third Edition. The Peterson Field Guide Series ®. Boston and New York: Houghton Mifflin Company. xiii + 533 pp. . (Trachemys gaigeae, pp. 253–254 + Plate 21 + Map 69).

Trachemys
Turtles of North America
Reptiles of the United States
Reptiles of Mexico
Fauna of the Rio Grande valleys
Taxa named by Norman Edouard Hartweg
Reptiles described in 1939